Tejuosho or Tejuoso may refer to 
Adedapo Tejuoso, Nigerian monarch
Bisoye Tejuoso (1916-1996), Nigerian businesswoman, mother of Adedapo
Funmi Tejuosho (born 1965), Nigerian politician, sister-in-law of Lanre
Lanre Tejuosho (born 1964), Nigerian politician, son of Adedapo
Tejuosho Market in Nigeria

Yoruba-language surnames